Walter Blum (born September 28, 1934, in Brooklyn, New York) is a retired Hall of Fame jockey.

Riding career
A horse racing fan from boyhood, in his teens Blum began working as a racetrack hotwalker. Despite being blind in his right eye from the age of two, when he fell off a toy horse, in 1953 he embarked on a career as a jockey, riding his first winner on July 29 at Saratoga Race Course. During the better part of his 22-year career Blum rode mainly at East Coast tracks from New England to Florida and is one of only four jockeys to ever win six races on a single card at Monmouth Park.

However, in the 1960s he rode seasonally at California tracks, notably winning the 1966 Santa Anita Derby, and he also dominated Chicago's summer racing circuit at Arlington Park.

Achievements
On June 19, 1961, Blum rode six winners on a single racecard at Monmouth Park Racetrack. He won more races in 1963 and 1964 than any other American jockey. He rode in the Kentucky Derby and Preakness Stakes on two occasions, his best finish a fourth in both in 1967 aboard Reason to Hail. In the 1971 Belmont Stakes, he rode Pass Catcher to a victory that denied Canonero II the Triple Crown.

His best-known mounts were Hall of Famers Affectionately and Gun Bow with one of his most famous victories coming in the 1964 Woodward Stakes when he rode Gun Bow to a win over the legendary Kelso. In 1969, Blum was elected president of the Jockeys' Guild and served until 1974. He rode his last mount in 1975 then went to work as a racing official at Garden State Park and the Atlantic City racetracks. In 1978 he moved to Florida where he served as a state steward until retiring on December 30, 2004.

Honors
Blum is Jewish and was inducted in the International Jewish Sports Hall of Fame in 1986, and the following year in the United States Racing Hall of Fame.

References

Sources
 Walter Blum profile at the International Jewish Sports Hall of Fame website
 Walter Blum profile at the National Museum of Racing and Hall of Fame website

1934 births
Living people
American jockeys
United States Thoroughbred Racing Hall of Fame inductees
Sportspeople from Brooklyn
Jewish American sportspeople
21st-century American Jews